Pseudocrossidium is a genus of mosses belonging to the family Pottiaceae. It has a cosmopolitan distribution.

Species
The following species are recognised in the genus Pseudocrossidium:

Pseudocrossidium adustum 
Pseudocrossidium apiculatum 
Pseudocrossidium austrorevolutum 
Pseudocrossidium carinatum 
Pseudocrossidium chilense 
Pseudocrossidium crinitum 
Pseudocrossidium elatum 
Pseudocrossidium excavatum 
Pseudocrossidium exiguum 
Pseudocrossidium granulosum 
Pseudocrossidium hornschuchianum 
Pseudocrossidium leucocalyx 
Pseudocrossidium linearifolium 
Pseudocrossidium mendozense 
Pseudocrossidium obtusulum 
Pseudocrossidium pachygastrellum 
Pseudocrossidium pachyneuron 
Pseudocrossidium perpapillosum 
Pseudocrossidium perrevolutum 
Pseudocrossidium porphyreoneurum 
Pseudocrossidium replicatum 
Pseudocrossidium revolutum

References

Pottiaceae
Moss genera